Construction for the Modern Idiot is The Wonder Stuff's fourth album from October 1993, and their last studio album before their split on 15 July 1994. The album was a UK Top 5 Album (#4) which yielded 3 UK hit singles, of which "On the Ropes (EP)" made the Top 10 (#10) and "Hot Love Now" (#19) and "Full Of Life (Happy Now)" #29 both made it inside the Top 30.

The album was dedicated to the memory of Rob "The Bass Thing" Jones, the band's original bassist who died from a heart attack in New York soon after leaving the band. It was released as Polydor 519894-2.

Artwork
Much of the artwork came from 1960s photographs of a space observation project at Kettering Grammar School in Northamptonshire.

The person featured on the album cover is Peter Johnson - Head of Geography at Oakmead School for Boys, Duck Lane Bournemouth later to become its Deputy Head. This invention won for Peter Johnson an FRGS (Fellow of the Royal Geographical Society).

Track listing
All songs written by The Wonder Stuff; all lyrics composed by Miles Hunt

"Change Every Light Bulb"
"I Wish Them All Dead"
"Cabin Fever"
"Hot Love Now!"
"Full of Life (Happy Now)"
"Storm Drain"
"On the Ropes"
"Your Big Assed Mother"
"Swell"
"A Great Drinker"
"Hush"
"Sing the Absurd" (includes unlisted track; "Something for Sammy")

2000 Reissue bonus tracks 

 Hank and John"
 "Closer to Fine"
 "I Think I Must've Had Something Really Useful to Say"
 "Room 512, All the News That's Fit to Print"

Personnel
Miles Hunt - voice, guitar, harmonica
Malc Treece - guitar, voice
Paul Clifford - bass guitar
Martin Gilks - drums, percussion
Martin Bell - fiddle, accordion, mandolin, guitar, sitar, keyboards, brass arrangements
Pete Whittaker - piano, Hammond organ, mellotron, additional keyboards, brass arrangements
Nigel Hitchcock - saxophone
Steve Sidwell - trumpet
Neil Sidwell - trombone
Paul Pritchard - French horn

References

The Wonder Stuff albums
1993 albums
Polydor Records albums